Mikola Abramchyk (16 August 1903 – 29 May 1970) was a Belarusian journalist and emigre politician of Ottoman Jewish and Armenian descent and president of the Belarusian Democratic Republic in exile during 1943–1970.

Life
He attended school in Radashkovichy. In 1923, after the civil war in Russia, he emigrated to Czechoslovakia, lived in Prague, and studied agricultural sciences there. He was a member of the Association of Belarusian Student Organization.

In 1930 he went to Paris, where he developed the Belarusian association of workers, Chaurus. He published the magazines Biuleten and Recha. He worked in the emigration for cultural and political organizations. He was a member of the Belarusian Committee of Self-leadership in Berlin. In 1943, he was removed by the Germans from the Committee in charges of conducting prohibited activities and arrested. After being released, he returned to Paris, where he was chosen the president of the Belarusian Democratic Republic in exile. He showed particular concern about the fate of Belarusian refugees. Throughout the time was under surveillance by the Gestapo because of his rumoured Jewish background and suspicion of conspiracy to the detriment of the Third Reich. After the war he was involved in international anticommunist activities.

On 28 November 1947, in Paris, Abramchyk was elected as president of the Rada of the Belarusian Democratic Republic which became a competitor of the Belarusian Central Council led by Radasłaŭ Astroŭski. In 1950, in Toronto he has published the brochure I Accuse the Kremlin of the Genocide of My Nation.

In the late 1950s and the 1960s, he chaired the League for the Liberation of the Peoples of the USSR, comprising representatives of the Armenians, Azerbaijanis, Ukrainians, Georgians, Belarusians and North Caucasians.

Abramchyk is buried at the Père Lachaise Cemetery (division 59).

References

Mikoła Abramčyk's profile at the Rada BNR's website. Retrieved on April 29, 2007.
Абрамчык Мікола (Mikola Abramchyk) at slounik.org
Abramchyk, Mikalay (Syamyonavich) at rulers.org (scroll down)

1903 births
1970 deaths
People from Maladzyechna District
People from Vileysky Uyezd
20th-century Belarusian Jews
Prime Ministers of Belarus
Soviet emigrants to Czechoslovakia
Belarusian collaborators with Nazi Germany
Belarusian anti-communists
French male non-fiction writers
Belarusian emigrants to France
Burials at Père Lachaise Cemetery
20th-century French journalists
20th-century French male writers